Ramey Air Force Base is a former United States Air Force base in Aguadilla, Puerto Rico. It was named after United States Army Air Forces Brigadier General Howard Knox Ramey. Following its closure, it was redeveloped into Rafael Hernandez Airport.

History

Pre-World War II
In 1939, the U.S. Army Air Corps sent Major George C. Kenney to Puerto Rico to conduct a preliminary survey of possible air base sites on Puerto Rico. He examined 42 sites and declared that Punta Borinquen the best site for a major air base. Sugar cane farms covered some 3796 acres that the government purchased for military use in the first week of September 1939 at a cost of $1,215,000. Later that year, Major Karl S. Axtater assumed command of what was to become Borinquen Army Airfield.

World War II era
During World War II, the following squadrons were assigned to the airfield:
 Headquarters, 25th Bombardment Group, 1 November 1940 – 1 November 1942; 5 October 1943 – 24 March 1944
 417th Bombardment Squadron, 21 November 1939 – 13 April 1942 (Douglas B-18 Bolo)
 10th Bombardment Squadron, 1 November 1940 – 1 November 1942 (B-18 Bolo)
 12th Bombardment Squadron, 1 November 1940 – 8 November 1941 (B-18 Bolo)
 35th Bombardment Squadron, 31 October-11 November 1941 (B-18 Bolo)
 44th Bombardment Squadron (40th Bombardment Group) 1 April 1941 – 16 June 1942 (B-18 Bolo)
 20th Troop Carrier Squadron (Panama Air Depot) June 1942 – July 1943 (Douglas C-47 Skytrain)
 4th Tactical Reconnaissance Squadron (72d Reconnaissance Group) 27 October 1943 – 21 May 1945; 5 October 1945 – 20 August 1946

Cold War era

With the establishment of an independent United States Air Force in 1947, the complex was renamed Ramey Air Force Base in 1948. Ramey AFB was home to a succession of Strategic Air Command (SAC) strategic reconnaissance wings and a bombardment wing, and housed a number of B-36 Peacemaker intercontinental bombers, albeit in its RB-36 strategic reconnaissance version.  The RB-36s were later replaced by B-52 Stratofortress heavy bombers and KC-135 Stratotanker aerial refueling aircraft, while a tenant weather reconnaissance squadron operated WB-47 Stratojet and WC-130 Hercules aircraft. Due to the size and weight of the B-36, the runway at Ramey had to be built to a length of 11,702 ft and a width of 200 ft, with an added 870 ft Blast Pad at each end and an additional 50 ft shoulder on each side.

The closure of Ramey Air Force Base began in 1971 as part of a SAC-wide reduction in bombardment wings and lasted until 1973. Following its closure, it was converted into a joint civilian-military airport with the United States Coast Guard comprising the remaining military aviation activities at the airport as Coast Guard Air Station Borinquen and Puerto Rico Air National Guard, Army National Guard and the United States Army Reserve maintaining non-aviation units.

 Antilles Air Command, 1 March-25 August 1946
 As: Antilles Air Division, 12 January 1948 – 22 January 1949
 24th Composite Wing, 25 August 1946 – 28 June 1948
 55th Strategic Reconnaissance Wing, 1 November 1950 – 1953
 72nd Strategic Reconnaissance Wing, 1953 – 1959 (RB-36 Peacemaker)
 72nd Bombardment Wing, 1959 – 30 June 1971 (B-52 Stratofortress)

U.S. Naval Facility Ramey/Punta Borinquen
Success with a test array and then a full scale 40-element operational array at Eleuthera, Bahamas 1951-1952 led the Navy in 1952 to order six (quickly expanded to nine) undersea surveillance systems under the classified name of Sound Surveillance System (SOSUS) to be installed under the unclassified name Project Caesar. The shore terminals were described as supporting "oceanographic research" and given the generic and ambiguous name "Naval Facility" with the actual submarine detection purpose classified on a strict need-to-know basis. The first of the systems was to terminate at a Naval Facility (NAVFAC) on a beach under the cliff of the Air Force Base. Construction began in 1953 with Naval Facility Ramey commissioned on 18 September 1954. In 1985 with mobile, towed arrays entering the system, SOSUS became the Integrated Undersea Surveillance System (IUSS). SOSUS/IUSS mark their beginnings with the commissioning of Naval Facility Ramey.

The facility, unlike NAVFAC Grand Turk and NAVFAC San Salvador completed later that year and not close to a military base, got support for all functions except its classified operations from the base. When the Air Force Base closed 1 January 1974 the facility became Naval Facility Punta Borinquen and self supporting until it was decommissioned 30 April 1976.

Remaining military presence
In 1971, as a result of the closing of Naval Air Station Isla Grande, the United States Coast Guard relocated its aviation activities to Ramey. The Coast Guard took possession of an outstanding hangar, a part of the Air Force housing area and the DoDEA Ramey Unit School for the newly formed Coast Guard Air Station Borinquen. The Coast Guard Exchange system operates a post exchange (PX) near the coast guard air station. The Punta Borinquen Light was also transferred to the Coast Guard.

Punta Borinquen Radar Station near the Ramey Golf Course is a Puerto Rico Air National Guard facility, home for the 141st Air Control Squadron. 

The Puerto Rico Army National Guard also has some units and facilities at the former Air Force Base. The United States Army Reserve operates the Ramey United States Army Reserve Center. Among the units at the Ramey USARC is the 35th Expeditionary Signal Battalion Bravo Company and the 210 Regional Support Group. Military retirees choose to settle in the area mostly because of the Ramey Golf Course and services they are entitled to at the coast guard air station.

See also
 Transport in Puerto Rico
 List of airports in Puerto Rico
 Coast Guard Air Station Borinquen
 Punta Borinquen Light
 Punta Borinquen Radar Station
 Rafael Hernández Airport
 Military of Puerto Rico

References

 Maurer, Maurer. Air Force Combat Units of World War II. Washington, DC: U.S. Government Printing Office 1961 (republished 1983, Office of Air Force History).
 Ravenstein, Charles A. Air Force Combat Wings Lineage and Honors Histories 1947–1977. Maxwell Air Force Base, Alabama: Office of Air Force History 1984. .

External links
 OpenStreetMap – Ramey
 Ramey AFB Historical Association

Bases of the United States Air Force
Defunct airports in Puerto Rico
Military facilities in Puerto Rico
Buildings and structures in Aguadilla, Puerto Rico
Installations of Strategic Air Command
Military installations closed in 1973
1936 establishments in Puerto Rico
1973 disestablishments in Puerto Rico